is a prefecture of Japan located in the Chūbu region of Honshu. Yamanashi Prefecture has a population of 817,192 (1 January 2019) and has a geographic area of 4,465 km2 (1,724 sq mi). Yamanashi Prefecture borders Saitama Prefecture to the northeast, Nagano Prefecture to the northwest, Shizuoka Prefecture to the southwest, Kanagawa Prefecture to the southeast, and Tokyo to the east.

Kōfu is the capital and largest city of Yamanashi Prefecture, with other major cities including Kai, Minamiarupusu, and Fuefuki. Yamanashi Prefecture is one of only eight landlocked prefectures, and the majority of the population lives in the central Kōfu Basin surrounded by the Akaishi Mountains, with 27% of its total land area being designated as Natural Parks. Yamanashi Prefecture is home to many of the highest mountains in Japan, and Mount Fuji, the tallest mountain in Japan and cultural icon of the country, is partially located in Yamanashi Prefecture on the border with Shizuoka Prefecture.

History

Pre-history to the 14th century
As in most other Japanese regions, prehistoric society in Yamanashi progressed through the hunting, fishing and gathering stage of the Jōmon period, then the rice-producing stage of the Yayoi period and subsequent village and regional formation. The Maruyama and Choshizuka Kofun (earthen burial mounds) located on Sone Hill of Nakamichi Town (Southern Kōfu) are believed to have been built from the end of the 4th century. From these remains it can be assumed that the people of Sone Hill had great influence.

During the Heian period, Kai Province was created in this area.

15th to 19th centuries
Among the many Kaigenji generations, those of the Takeda, Ogasawara, and Nanbu families were particularly prosperous. During the Sengoku period of the 16th century, Takeda Shingen attained the status of daimyō and built Tsuzuji Mansion and the Yōgai Castle in Kōfu. From this base, he attempted to unify and control Japan.

After Takeda's death in 1582, Kai-no-Kuni came under the control of the Oda and Toyotomi clans before being subsumed into the Tokugawa shogunate during the Edo period. Beneath the Edo shogunate, the Kōfu clan (based in Kuninaka, or Central and Western Yamanashi) and the Yamura clan (based in Gunnai, or Eastern Yamanashi) were formed, but in 1724 the area came under the direct control of the Shogunate. With the development of the Kōshū Kaidō (highway) and Fuji River transport, goods, materials and culture flowed into the region.

By the mid-19th century, the contradictions of military government and clan system caused stability to erode and resistance to erupt across Japan, paving the way for the Meiji Restoration of 1868.

Meiji Restoration (1868)  to end of World War II (1945)

During the Boshin War, the Battle of Kōshū-Katsunuma on the 29 March 1868 was a significant battle between pro-Imperial and Tokugawa shogunate forces immediately prior to the Imperial Forces march on Edo Castle. Preceding the Kōshū-Katsunuma battle, Kōfu Castle had been captured by troops loyal to the Emperor Meiji.

The province was renamed Kōfu Prefecture in 1869 and then Yamanashi Prefecture in 1871. The anniversary of this event on November 20, 1872, is now celebrated as Prefectural Citizen's Day in Yamanashi.

In the early part of the Meiji period (1868–1911), industrial promotion policies furthered sericulture, silk textile production and wine making industries. In 1903, after seven years of construction, including the building of a nearly three mile long tunnel at the Sasago Pass, the Chūō Railway Line from Hachiōji and central Tokyo finally reached Kōfu. The reduced journey times to the capital and the port of Yokohama brought significant change to local industry and culture.

Agricultural production in farming communities was still on a small scale at the turn of the century and land reforms had yet to be introduced.  From the 1920s however, tenancy and contract disputes between landowners and farmers in Yamanashi grew increasingly common.

In 1926, the Minobu Railway Line connecting Kōfu with Shizuoka Prefecture opened, bringing an end to Fuji River transportation.  The Koumi Line connecting Kobuchizawa to Kiyosato was opened by Japanese National Railways (JNR) in 1933, providing access to hitherto remote highland areas on the slopes of Mt. Yatsugatake in the North of the prefecture.

1945 to present
The capital city, Kōfu, suffered extensive damage during a major air raid on the night of 6 July 1945. From 1945 onwards, as part of economic initiatives introduced under the post war Government of Occupation, agricultural land reforms significantly increased the number of individual farms and promoted fruit farming and viticulture throughout the prefecture. At first with limited success in 1946, but on a much more sustained basis in 1951, dairy farming, introduced by American Paul Rusch, became a feature of highland pastures surrounding the town of Kiyosato.

Small scale manufacturing industries and commerce grew at rapid speed during the expansion of the post-war Japanese economy.  The 1982 opening of the Chūō Expressway also led to significant growth in service industries, transport logistics and tourism.

In common with many similar sized cities during the 1990s, rapid growth in car ownership, out of town shopping, and improved transportation links to Tokyo, caused a drop in commercial activity and land values in the center of the prefectural capital Kōfu. To counterbalance this trend the prefectural government launched a city center revitalization plan in 2008, promoting downtown tourist attractions such as redeveloped land North of Kōfu station, Maizuru Castle Park and new residential, cultural and government office facilities.

Planned changes in transportation infrastructure also promise to significantly impact the Yamanashi economy in the coming decades; under mountains in the eastern part of the prefecture is a completed 42.8 km section of the SCMaglev test track, a section of the planned Chūō Shinkansen.

The maglev line is designed to ultimately connect Tokyo, Nagoya, and Osaka with a station also planned to the South of Kōfu.

Central Government permission to proceed with an extension to the existing test track was granted on May 27, 2011.  At the end of 2013 construction was already well advanced as far as Fuefuki.

JR Central is considering opening a demonstration service from a new station in Kōfu by the 2020 Summer Olympics so that visitors can also ride on the experimental track through the Yamanashi mountains.

Geography 
Yamanashi Prefecture is bordered by Tokyo, Kanagawa Prefecture, Saitama Prefecture, Shizuoka Prefecture, and Nagano Prefecture. The prefecture is landlocked, with high mountains surrounding the central Kōfu Basin. Mount Fuji and the Fuji Five Lakes region is located on the southern border with Shizuoka. Mount Fuji provides rain shadow effects, and as a result, the prefecture receives only about 818 mm of rainfall a year.As of April 1, 2012, 27% of the total land area of the prefecture was designated as Natural Parks, namely the Chichibu Tama Kai, Fuji-Hakone-Izu, and Minami Alps National Parks; Yatsugatake-Chūshin Kōgen Quasi-National Park; and Minami Alps Koma and Shibireko Prefectural Natural Parks.

78% of the prefecture is covered by forests, making it one of the most densely wooded prefectures in Japan. Land cultivated for agriculture is mainly restricted to the lower elevations of the Kōfu basin.

Cities

Thirteen cities are located in Yamanashi Prefecture:

Towns and villages
These are the towns and villages in each district:

Mergers

List of governors of Yamanashi Prefecture

Economy 
Yamanashi has a sizable industrial base in and around Kōfu city, with jewelry and robotics industries being particularly prominent. The headquarters of FANUC, manufacturer of factory automation systems, is based in Oshino in the south of the prefecture.

The prefecture is also host to numerous fruit farms and vineyards.  Yamanashi is one of the major fruit producing regions in Japan, being the top domestic producer of grapes, peaches, plums, as well as wine.

In addition, roughly 40% of the mineral water bottled in Japan comes from Yamanashi, mainly from around the Southern Alps, Mount Fuji, and Mitsutōge areas. The quality of the water sources in the Southern Alps prompted Suntory Group to open the Hakushu distillery in the northern Yamanashi town of Hokuto.

Population 

Per Japanese census data, Yamanashi prefecture had negative population growth from 1950 to 1970 and again in the 21st century, with the population peaking at roughly 890,000 around the turn of the millenium.

Tourism 

The natural scenery and cultural sights of Yamanashi are popular destinations for both domestic and international tourists due to the prefecture's proximity to the crowded Tokyo conurbation and ease of access by road and rail. Mount Fuji, the Fuji Five Lakes region, the highland resort region of Kiyosato, the city of Kōfu, the Senga Falls, Koshu wineries, the temple of Erin-ji in Koshu, and the Kuonji Temple at Minobu are a few of the most popular places to visit.

The Fuji-Q Highland amusement park at Fujiyoshida with roller coasters Eejanaika, and Takabisha, the world's steepest roller coaster, is also a popular destination for day trips. It also features Do-Dodonpa, the world's fastest accelerating roller coaster. At one point, it was also the world's fastest roller coaster before Cedar Point's Top Thrill Dragster took the record in 2003.

The natural topography of the region makes Yamanashi popular with mountaineering, hiking and climbing enthusiasts throughout the year. The Mt. Fuji summer hiking season in July and August attracts thousands of overnight hikers typically starting at the Fifth Station in the late evening and climbing through the night to witness the sunrise at the summit.

Although not as tall, Mount Minobu, a popular place for Buddhist pilgrimage, offers extensive views from the summit of the mountain. Parts of the Fuji-Hakone-Izu National Park, Chichibu-Tama-Kai National Park, and Minami Alps National Park are all located in Yamanashi.

Given the area's volcanic activity, natural hot springs, or onsens, are found in abundance. Some of the more well known are Shimobe Onsen, Isawa Onsen and Yamanami Onsen.

Major festivals

 Shingen festival, held each March in the precincts of Kōfu Castle and Takeda Shrine in commemoration of Takeda Shingen's role in prefectural history.
 Fujiyoshida fire festival, marks the end of the summer climbing season on Mount Fuji. Held on the last weekend in August.
 Yatsugatake county fair and Paul Rusch festival.  Held each October in Kiyosato to celebrate the life and work of Paul Rusch, his contributions to local agricultural development and US Japan friendship.

Universities 
 Tsuru University
 University of Yamanashi
 Yamanashi Gakuin University
 Yamanashi Prefectural University
 Yamanashi Eiwa College

Sports 

Ventforet Kōfu, the J2 League association football (soccer) team is based in Kōfu. The team's home ground is the Yamanashi Chuo Bank Stadium.

Since 2005 the Fujizakura Country Club in Fujikawaguchiko has also hosted the Fujisankei Classic golf tournament, an annual event on the Japan Golf Tour.

Transportation

Railway lines 
East Japan Railway Company
Chūō Main Line
Koumi Line
Central Japan Railway Company
Minobu Line
Fuji Kyuko
Fujikyuko Line
Chūō Shinkansen(Under construction)

Road

Expressways 
 Chuo Expressway
 Chūbu-Ōdan Expressway (under construction)
 Higashifuji-goko Road 
 Kōfu Yamanashi Road

National highways 

 Route 20
 Route 52
 Route 137
 Route 138
 Route 139
 Route 140
 Route 141
 Route 411
 Route 413
 Route 469

Media

Television 
 Yamanashi Broadcasting System (YBS)
 UHF Television Yamanashi (UTY)

Radio 
 FM Fuji (FMF)

Sister states and regions
  Iowa, United States (since 1960)
  Minas Gerais, Brazil (since 1973)
  Sichuan Province, China (since 1985)
  Chungcheongbuk-do, Korea (since 1992)
  Saône-et-Loire, France (since 2000)
  Fairfield, California, United States (since the 1970s)

Notes

References
 Nussbaum, Louis-Frédéric and Käthe Roth. (2005).  Japan encyclopedia. Cambridge: Harvard University Press. ; OCLC 58053128

External links 

Yamanashi Prefecture Official Website 
Yamanashi Prefecture Official Website 

 
Chūbu region
Prefectures of Japan